Adams County is a county in the Commonwealth of Pennsylvania. As of the 2020 census, the population was 103,852. Its county seat is Gettysburg. The county was created on January 22, 1800, from part of York County, and was named for the second President of the United States, John Adams. On July 1–3, 1863, a crucial battle of the American Civil War was fought near Gettysburg; Adams County as a result is a center of Civil War tourism.

Adams County comprises the Gettysburg metropolitan statistical area, which is also included in the Harrisburg–York–Lebanon combined statistical area.

Geography

The Borough of Gettysburg is located at the center of Adams County. This county seat community is surrounded on three sides by the Gettysburg National Military Park (GNMP). The Eisenhower National Historic Site adjoins GNMP on its southwestern edge. Most of Adams County's rural landscapes and its mid-19th century roadway pattern remain intact today. Thirteen historic roadways converge at or near Gettysburg Borough. This "spokes and wheel" pattern is one of the few examples of Central Place Theory in the Eastern United States.

The county is in the watershed of the Chesapeake Bay and is drained by the Susquehanna and Potomac Rivers.

Adjacent counties
Cumberland County (north)
York County (east)
Carroll County, Maryland (southeast)
Frederick County, Maryland (southwest)
Franklin County (west)

National protected areas
 Eisenhower National Historic Site
 Gettysburg National Military Park

Climate
Adams has a hot-summer humid continental climate (Dfa).

Government

Commissioners
Adams County is administered by a three-person Board of Commissioners, who serve four-year terms. Elections occur in the odd-numbered years that precede U.S. presidential elections, with the next election falling in 2023. All three Commissioners are chosen in the same election, and voters may vote for no more than two of the candidates. The Commissioners are responsible for the management of the fiscal and administrative functions of the county.

Elected County Officials
As of the November 2017 election:

Politics
Presidential politics

Adams is a consistently Republican county, like most of South Central Pennsylvania. In 2020, Donald Trump carried the county with 66.3% of the vote to Joe Biden's 32.2%. In 2016, Democratic nominee Hillary Clinton only received 29.6% of the vote, the lowest share any Democrat had received in the county since George McGovern 44 years prior. No Democratic presidential candidate has won Adams County since Lyndon Johnson’s 1964 landslide. However, Democratic strength exists in Gettysburg, which Biden carried 63%-35%.

|}

Pennsylvania House of Representatives
Adams County consists of two Pennsylvania House Districts. The 91st district is exclusively in Adams County, comprising the southern and middle parts of the county, including Gettysburg. The 193rd District spans into Cumberland County to the north.

Pennsylvania Senate
Adams County is entirely contained within the 33rd Senatorial District, which also includes parts of York and Franklin Counties.

United States House of Representatives
From 2012 until 2018, Adams County was part of the 4th Congressional District until the Pennsylvania Supreme Court ruled that the Commonwealth's Congressional Districts constituted an illegal partisan Gerrymander. As a result, Adams County was moved from the 4th District to the 13th Congressional District and elected a new Representative in the 2018 election.

United States Senate
 John Fetterman, Democratic
 Bob Casey Jr., Democratic

Voter registration
As of November 7, 2022 there were 72,464 registered voters in the county. Republicans hold a majority of the voters. There were 41,265 registered Republicans, 19,561 registered Democrats,  8,422 voters without any partisan affiliation, and 3,216 voters registered to other parties. "Other Parties" also includes voters who left their preferred party blank; only those who chose No Affiliation are included under No Partisan Affiliation.

Demographics

As of the 2010 census, there were 101,407 people, 33,652 households, and 24,767 families in the county. The population density was 194 people per square mile (75/km2). There were 35,831 housing units at an average density of 69 per square mile (27/km2). The racial makeup of the county was 95.39% White, 1.21% Black or African American, 0.20% Native American, 0.49% Asian, 0.02% Pacific Islander, 1.71% from other races, and 0.97% from two or more races.  3.64% of the population were Hispanic or Latino of any race. 42.7% were of German, 14.1% American, 8.5% Irish and 7.1% English ancestry. 95.0% spoke English and 3.6% Spanish as their first language.

There were 33,652 households, of which 33.70% had children under the age of 18 living with them, 61.10% were married couples living together, 8.50% had a female householder with no husband present, and 26.40% were non-families. 21.30% of all households were made up of individuals, and 9.20% had someone living alone who was 65 years of age or older. The average household size was 2.61 and the average family size was 3.02.

The county population was spread out, with 24.90% under the age of 18, 9.20% from 18 to 24, 28.90% from 25 to 44, 23.00% from 45 to 64, and 13.90% who were 65 years of age or older. The median age was 37 years. For every 100 females there were 96.30 males. For every 100 females age 18 and over, there were 93.80 males. Adams County is one of two counties in Pennsylvania where Latter-Day Saints make up 1% of the population.

2020 Census

Metropolitan and Combined Statistical Area
The US OMB has designated Adams County as the Gettysburg, PA metropolitan statistical area (MSA). As of the 2010 census the metropolitan area population of 101,407 ranked 19th most populous in the State of Pennsylvania and the 349th most populous in the United States. Adams County is also a part of the larger Harrisburg–York–Lebanon combined statistical area (CSA), which combines the populations of Adams County with those of Cumberland, Dauphin, Lebanon, Perry and York Counties in Pennsylvania. The Combined Statistical Area ranked 5th in the State of Pennsylvania and 43rd most populous in the United States with a population of 1,219,422.

Education

Colleges and universities
 Gettysburg College
 Lutheran Theological Seminary

Community, junior and technical colleges
 Harrisburg Area Community College

Public school districts
 Bermudian Springs School District
 Conewago Valley School District
 Fairfield Area School District
 Gettysburg Area School District
 Littlestown Area School District
 Upper Adams School District

Public charter schools
Gettysburg Montessori Charter School – Gettysburg (K-6)
Vida Charter School – Gettysburg (K-6)

County residents may apply to attend any of the Commonwealth's 14 (as of 2015) public, cyber charter schools at no additional cost to the parents.

Private schools

As reported by Pennsylvania Department of Education April 2015
Academy for Media Production – McSherrystown
Adams County Christian Academy – Gettysburg
Delone Catholic High School – McSherrystown
Forest Lane Mennonite School – Gettysburg
Freedom Christian School – Gettysburg
Gettysburg SDA Church School – Gettysburg
Independent Baptist Day School – Biglerville
JIL Christian School – Biglerville
Littlestown Christian Academy – Littlestown
Oxford Christian Academy – New Oxford
Paradise School – Abbottstown
St. Teresa of Calcutta School -McSherrystown
St James Child Care Center – Gettysburg
St Joseph Academy Preschool – McSherrystown

Intermediate Unit
Lincoln Intermediate Unit (IU#12) region includes: Adams, Franklin, and York Counties. The agency offers school districts, home schooled students and private schools many services including: Special education services, combined purchasing, and instructional technology services. It runs Summer Academy which offers both art and academic strands designed to meet the needs of gifted, talented and high achieving students. Additional services include: Curriculum Mapping, Professional Development for school employees, Adult Education, Nonpublic School Services, Business Services, Migrant & ESL (English as a Second Language), Instructional Services, Special Education, Management Services, and Technology Services. It provides a GED program for adults to earn a high school diploma, and offers literacy programs. The Lincoln Intermediate Unit is governed by a 13-member Board of Directors, each a member of a local school board from the 25 school districts. Board members are elected by school directors of all 25 school districts for three-year terms that begin July 1. There are 29 intermediate units in Pennsylvania. They are funded by school districts, state and federal program specific funding and grants; they do not have the power to tax.

Libraries

A R Wentz Library – Gettysburg
Adams County Historical Society – Gettysburg
Adams County Library at Carroll Valley – Carroll Valley
Adams County Law Library – Gettysburg
Gettysburg Library - Gettysburg
Harbaugh-Thomas Library – Biglervilleh
Jean Barnett Trone Memorial Library of East Berlin – East Berlin
Littlestown Community Library – Littlestown
Musselman Library – Gettysburg
New Oxford Area Library – New Oxford

Transportation

Air
There are currently no scheduled commercial flights into Adams County. The nearest airports with regular commercial service are in Hagerstown, Maryland (Hagerstown Regional Airport), Harrisburg, Pennsylvania (Harrisburg International Airport), and Lancaster, Pennsylvania (Lancaster Airport).

Bus
Public bus service in Adams County is available through the Adams County Transit Authority.

Major Highways

Recreation
Recreational areas of Adams County include 
 Caledonia State Park, state park named for an iron furnace that was owned by Thaddeus Stevens. Most of this park is in neighboring Franklin County, but a portion of it extends into Adams. It is near U.S. Route 30 between Chambersburg and Gettysburg.
 Eisenhower National Historic Site, the home and farm of 34th President of the United States Dwight D. Eisenhower.
 Gettysburg Battlefield, Civil War battlefield fought July 1–3, 1863
 Journey Through Hallowed Ground National Heritage Area, federally designated National Heritage Area in Maryland, Pennsylvania, Virginia, and West Virginia.
 McPherson Ridge, landform used during the Battle of Gettysburg
 Michaux State Forest
 Pennsylvania State Game Lands Number 249, providing hunting, trapping and other activities.
 Strawberry Hill Nature Preserve

Communities

Under Pennsylvania law, there are four types of incorporated municipalities: cities, boroughs, townships, and, in at most two cases, towns. The following boroughs and townships are located in Adams County, as well as unincorporated areas and CDPs:

Boroughs

Abbottstown
Arendtsville
Bendersville
Biglerville
Bonneauville
Carroll Valley
East Berlin
Fairfield
Gettysburg (county seat)
Littlestown
McSherrystown
New Oxford
York Springs

Townships

Berwick
Butler
Conewago
Cumberland
Franklin
Freedom
Germany
Hamilton
Hamiltonban
Highland
Huntington
Latimore
Liberty
Menallen
Mount Joy
Mount Pleasant
Oxford
Reading
Straban
Tyrone
Union

Census-designated places
Census-designated places are geographical areas designated by the U.S. Census Bureau for the purposes of compiling demographic data, but are not actual jurisdictions under Pennsylvania law. Other unincorporated communities, such as villages, may be listed here as well.

Aspers
Cashtown
Gardners
Hampton
Heidlersburg
Hunterstown
Idaville
Lake Heritage
Lake Meade
Midway
McKnightstown
Orrtanna
Table Rock

Unincorporated areas

Advance
Barlow
Beechersville
Berlin Junction
Bermudian
Bittinger
Bridgeport
Brush Run
Brushtown
Brysonia
Cedar Ridge
Centennial
Center Mills
Charnita
Cross Keys
Deardorffs Mill
Edgegrove
Fairplay
Floradale
Fountain Dale
Gargol
Georgetown
Germantown
Gladhill
Goldenville
Green Springs
Greenmount
Greenstone
Guernsey
Guldens
Hershey Heights
Hilltown
Indian Village
Irishtown
Iron Springs
Jacks Mountain
Kingsdale
Knoxlyn
Latimore
Maria Furnace
Menges Mill
Mount Hope
Mount Misery
Mount Tabor
Mummasburg
New Chester
Oak Grove
Peach Glen
Plainview
Quaker Valley
Sedgwick
Sell
Seven Stars
Shanks Mill
Slate Ridge
Square Corner
Stremmels
The Pines
Two Taverns
Virginia Mills
Wenksville
Whitehall
Zora

Population ranking
The population ranking of the following table is based on the 2010 census of Adams County.

† county seat

Notable people
 Joel Funk Asper, former U.S. Congressman
 Gabor Boritt, historian of Abraham Lincoln and the American Civil War, professor at Gettysburg College
 Jake Boritt, American documentary producer
 Henry R. Brinkerhoff, former U.S. Congressman
 David A. Day, former American Lutheran missionary to Liberia
 John A. Hauser, former president of C. H. Musselman Company
 Dwight D. Eisenhower and Mamie Eisenhower, their retirement home outside Gettysburg is preserved as Eisenhower National Historic Site
 Erik Harris, professional football player, Atlanta Falcons
 Eddie Plank, former Major League Baseball pitcher; third winningest left-handed pitcher of all time and 1946 Baseball Hall of Fame inductee
 John Studebaker, co-founder of company that became the Studebaker Corporation

See also
 Adams County Courthouse (Pennsylvania)
 National Register of Historic Places listings in Adams County, Pennsylvania
List of counties in Pennsylvania

References

External links

 
 Adams County Community Foundation
 Adams County Visitor Information

 
Pennsylvania counties
1800 establishments in Pennsylvania
Populated places established in 1800
Battle of Gettysburg
Battles of the American Civil War in Pennsylvania
Battles of the Gettysburg campaign
Battle of Gettysburg
Battle of Gettysburg
Battle of Gettysburg